Schickendantz is a German surname. Notable people with the surname include:

Friedrich Schickendantz (1837–1896), German-Argentine scientist
Guillermo Schickendantz (born 1979), Argentine field hockey player

See also
Schickedanz

German-language surnames